Teenage Mutant Ninja Turtles: Smash-Up is a 2.5D fighting game for the Wii and PlayStation 2 video game consoles featuring characters from the Teenage Mutant Ninja Turtles franchise. It was developed by Game Arts in cooperation with Mirage Studios, and features similar gameplay to the Super Smash Bros. series. The game was released by Ubisoft in September 2009 in celebration of the TMNT franchise's 25th anniversary. Upon release, the game received mixed critical reception.

Gameplay 

Teenage Mutant Ninja Turtles: Smash-Up is a four-player platform fighter. During battle, players attempt to KO opponents by depleting their life bar, knocking them off the stage or into traps. Each character has their own unique move set, with many able to perform additional techniques such as clinging to and leaping from walls. Characters are color-coded on-screen via an optional glow effect to help players keep track of their character. Like Super Smash Bros., the game features many customizable options for battles.

The game stresses interaction with the environment, and stages in the game feature traps, changes to the stage itself and interactive elements. Items will occasionally appear on the stage for players to collect, including life-restoring pizza and ninja skills that grant players special abilities like fire breathing and electrical shields.

In addition to standard Battle Royal multiplayer battles, Smash-Up offers several other gameplay modes. Arcade features a brief story in which Splinter challenges the turtles, April O'Neil and Casey Jones to a tournament, with unique endings for each of the seven characters. Survival challenges players to defeat 100 opponents before they lose three lives. Swap-Out allows players to choose two characters and switch between them at will in battle. Mission Mode requires players to complete certain objectives in 51 pre-set scenarios, such as attacking targets or defeating an opponent within a time limit. The game also features Tournament and Practice modes, as well as additional mini-games and online multiplayer features. Players can collect 'shells' during battles or mini-games and use them to unlock special features, including additional character costumes, concept art from various TMNT media, and trophies that other players can win in online tournaments.

Characters
Smash-Up features a total of 16 playable characters, four of which are exclusive to the Wii version of the game. Of the playable roster, only seven can be used in the game's Arcade mode.

Development
Smash-Up was developed by Japanese game developer Game Arts, who had previously worked on Super Smash Bros. Brawl, and by several former members of Team Ninja, who previously worked on Ninja Gaiden II and the Dead or Alive series. The game's existence was teased in late 2008 before being officially revealed on January 26, 2009. While Smash-Up is not specifically tied to any previous Ninja Turtles license, it bears a similar artistic style to the 2007 CGI animated film TMNT and features voice acting by the cast of the 2003 animated series. Mirage Studios helped influence the game's character roster, which was said to include characters "you know well in addition to surprise characters you certainly wouldn't expect". The game's arcade mode cut scenes were co-written by TMNT co-creator Peter Laird and illustrated by Mirage Studios artists Jim Lawson and Eric Talbot.

Reception 

The game's critical reception was mixed upon release. IGN gave Teenage Mutant Ninja Turtles: Smash-Up a score of 7/10, stating that "It's a Smash Bros. clone, but it just makes you want to play Smash Bros., instead." GameSpot also gave it a 7/10, stating that the game "has good combat and solid content, but it lacks the refinement and razzle-dazzle to earn a title shot."  Even so, some fans reacted negatively to the roster, which is significantly smaller than that of Super Smash Bros. Brawl and contains characters only seen in the 2003 cartoon series and 2007 film, while characters from the 1987 series and other films were ignored.

References

External links

2009 video games
3D fighting games
Action video games
Game Arts games
Ubisoft games
Fighting games
Multiplayer and single-player video games
Platform fighters
Smash-Up
Video games based on Teenage Mutant Ninja Turtles
Video games developed in Japan
Video games featuring female protagonists
Video games with 2.5D graphics
Wii Wi-Fi games
Video games set in New York City